The HP-42S RPN Scientific is a programmable RPN Scientific hand held calculator introduced by Hewlett Packard in 1988. It has advanced functions suitable for applications in mathematics, linear algebra, statistical analysis, computer science and others.

Overview
Perhaps the HP-42S was to be released as a replacement for the aging HP-41 series as it is designed to be compatible with all programs written for the HP-41. Since it lacked expandability, and lacked any real I/O ability, both key features of the HP-41 series, it was marketed as an HP-15C replacement.

The 42S, however, has a much smaller form factor than the 41, and features many more built-in functions, such as a matrix editor, complex number support, an equation solver, user-defined menus, and basic graphing capabilities (the 42S can draw graphs only by programs). Additionally, it features a two-line dot matrix display, which made stack manipulation easier to understand.

Production of the 42S ended in 1995. As this calculator is regarded amongst the best ever made in terms of quality, key stroke feel, ease of programming, and daily usability for engineers, in the HP calculator community the 42S has become famous for its high prices in online auctions, up to several times its introduction price, which has created a scarcity for utility end users.

Specifications

 Series: Pioneer
 Code Name: Davinci
 Introduction: 1988-10-31
 64 KB of ROM
 8 KB of RAM
 Functions: Over 350
 Expandability: Officially no other than IR printing (32 KB memory upgrade and over-clocking hardware hacks are possible)
 Peripherals: HP 82240A infrared printer

Features
 All basic scientific functions (including hyperbolic functions)
 Statistics (including curve fitting and forecasting)
 Probability (including factorial, random numbers and Gamma function)
 Equation solver (root finder) that can solve for any variable in an equation
 Numerical integration for calculating definite integrals
 Matrix operations (including a matrix editor, dot product, cross product and solver for simultaneous linear equations)
 Complex numbers (including polar coordinates representation)
 Vector functions
 Named variables, registers and binary flags
 Graphic display with graphics functions and adjustable contrast
 Menus with submenus and mode settings (also custom programmable) that use the bottom line of the display to label the top row of keys
 Sound (piezoelectric beeper)
 Base conversion, integer arithmetic and binary and logic manipulation of numbers in binary, octal, decimal and hexadecimal systems
 Catalogs for reviewing and using items stored in memory
 Programmability (keystroke programming with branching, loops, tests and flags)
 The ability to run programs written for the HP-41C series of calculators

Programming

The HP-42S is keystroke-programmable, meaning that it can remember and later execute sequences of keystrokes to solve particular problems of interest to the user. The HP-42S uses a superset of the HP-41CX FOCAL language.

The HP-42S supports indirect addressing with which it is possible to implement a Universal Turing machine and therefore the programming model of the HP-42S can be considered Turing-complete.

Sample program 
This is a sample program which computes the factorial of an input integer number (ignoring the calculator's built-in factorial function). The program consumes 18 bytes. No memory registers are used.

Legacy
In May 2017, SwissMicros released pre-production samples of an RPN calculator closely resembling the HP-42S, the DM42. The final product was released on the 9 December 2017. Even though slightly smaller (144×77×13 mm, 170 g) than the original HP-42S (148×80×15 mm, 170 g), the calculator comes with an additional top row of keys for soft menus, a keyboard layout supporting direct alpha character input, a much larger high-contrast display (Sharp low power transflective memory LCD with a resolution of 400×240, protected by Gorilla Glass) showing all four stack levels at once (configurable), ca. 75 KB usable RAM, a beeper, a callable real-time clock as well as an infrared port for HP 82240A/HP 82240B printer support and a USB interface (with Micro-B connector) emulating a FAT16-formatted USB mass storage device for easy program transfer and state backup / transfer as well as for firmware updates. The calculator, which comes in a stainless steel case with matte black physical vapor deposition (PVD) coating, supports keyboard overlays and is based on a modified version of Thomas Okken's GPLed Free42 simulator with Intel's decimal floating-point math library for higher precision (decimal128) running on an STM32L476RG processor (ARM Cortex-M4 core, 128 KB RAM, 1 MB internal flash) with another 8 MB of external QSPI flash (of which ca. 6 MB are available to users). It is powered by a CR2032 coin cell or via USB and clocked dynamically at 24-80 MHz. The DM42 is also the hardware basis for the community-developed WP 43S calculator, a successor to the WP 34S.

An open-source software version of the HP-42S (Free42) was developed by Thomas Okken that runs on iOS, Android, Windows, MacOS, and Linux. Its source code has been released under the GNU General Public License.

See also
FOCAL character set
Comparison of HP graphing calculators
 HP calculators
 List of Hewlett-Packard pocket calculators

References

Further reading
 
 
 
 HP-42S Quick Reference Guide (1 ed.). Corvallis, OR, USA, Dex Smith. October 1988. 00042-92222E.

External links
 SwissMicros DM42
 HP-42S intro on hpcc.org
 HP-42S page on hpmuseum.org
 HP-42S resources on hp42s.com (defunct as of July 2017)
 HP-42S description on rskey.org
 HP-42S description on thimet.de
 Free42 for Android by Thomas Okken, an Open Source project.
 

42S
42S
42S
Computer-related introductions in 1988